Chiromantis kelleri is a species of frog in the family Rhacophoridae. It is found in eastern and southern Ethiopia, northern Kenya, and Somalia; its range probably extends into South Sudan. The specific name kelleri honours  who collected the type series. Common name Keller's foam-nest frog has been proposed for it.

Description
The dorsum is rough and has usually grey and brown colouration, sometimes with darker markings. The throat is grey in males. The belly is darkened. The fingers and the toes are partially webbed and bear small terminal discs. The male advertisement call is a slow creak.

Habitat and conservation
Chiromantis kelleri occurs in arid savanna and shrubland. Breeding takes place in temporary pools and involves foam nests. It is a widespread and not particularly rare species that appears to tolerate extreme environmental conditions. It could be threatened by environmental degradation caused by human settlement and expansion, and the resulting increase in livestock, although it appears to be reasonably adaptable. It probably occurs in some protected areas, for example Omo and Mago National Parks in southern Ethiopia.

See also 

 Chiromantis petersii
 African foam-nest tree frog
 Grey foam-nest tree frog

References

kelleri
Frogs of Africa
Amphibians of Kenya
Amphibians of Ethiopia
Amphibians of Somalia
Amphibians described in 1893
Taxa named by Oskar Boettger
Taxonomy articles created by Polbot